Seoul Subway Line 9, operated by Seoul Metro Line9 Corporation, is a subway line in Seoul. The line runs east from Gaehwa Station (local train terminal) or Gimpo Airport Station (express train terminal, connecting to Line 5 and Airport Railroad) along the south bank of the Han River towards VHS Medical Center in Gangdong. In 2019, Line 9 has an annual ridership of 225 million or about 616,000 people per day.

Line 9 was constructed as a double track subway, but several stations feature passing loops enable express trains to overtake local trains. Express trains run around five times per hour in each direction. All stations are equipped with elevators, escalators, and platform screen doors.

Phase 1 (Gaewha to Sinnonhyeon) was the first privately run subway line in Korea. The franchisee of phase 1 is Seoul Metro Line 9 Corporation (SML9), who oversaw the construction of the phase 1. SML9 contracted the operation to Seoul Line9 Operation (SL9), a joint venture of Hyundai Rotem (20%) and RATP Dev Transdev Asia (80%, formerly Veolia Transport Korea). Collectively, SLM9 and SL9 are known as Metro9. However, phase 2 (Sinnonhyeon to Sports Complex) and further phases are operated by Seoul Metro.

History 
Line 9 was one of the lines first discussed as part of Seoul's 3rd phase of subway construction in 1991. In 1993, Seoul announced a plan for new construction of subway lines 9~12 and the extension of subway line 3. Construction of the 3rd phase was delayed by the 1995 Daegu explosions, funding issues, the 1997 financial crisis and a 1998 review of the plan that reduced the scope of the 3rd phase. In 2001, the city passed the feasibility study and execution designs for line 9 and confirmed the commencement of construction.

Construction of Phase 1 between Gaehwa and Sinnonhyeon began in April 2002. Originally scheduled to open on June 12, 2009, the line opened on July 24, 2009, to ensure that the line was fully ready to begin service. Line 9 opened with 24 four-car trains numbered 9-01~9–24; the express service ran every 20 minutes and the local service every 6.7 minutes.

Due to increasing ridership (numbers soon exceeded 250,000 per day), 12 additional four-car trains were ordered to alleviate capacity constraints. These trains, numbered 9–25~9–36, entered service on October 15, 2011. This allowed for the express service headway to be shortened to 10 minutes and the local service headway to 5 minutes. On September 30, 2013, additional express trains were added during commuting times of 7 to 9 AM (from 22 to 36), further reducing the headway.

Phase 2 extended the line from Sinnonhyeon in Gangnam to Sports Complex station (Seoul) on Line 2, and was opened on March 28, 2015. Phase 3 further extended the line to VHS Medical Center Station in eastern Seoul, and was opened on December 1, 2018. The following workdays saw a 6.4% increase in passengers, roughly 145,000 people, as the line now services a larger area to the east.

Due to capacity issues on the express service due to increasing ridership, express trains were gradually lengthened to six cars starting on December 30, 2017. Non-express trains were also expanded to six-car trains by the end of 2019. An additional three trains were expected to be delivered by the end of 2019, but have not been delivered as of January 2020.

Future 
The line is expected to be extended four stops north to Saemteo Park in Gangdong. One of the stations will provide another transfer to Seoul Subway Line 5 at Godeok.

The Korean government initially proposed a one-seat ride from Incheon International Airport to Gangnam via Gimpo International Airport using either Line 9 or Airport Railroad trains sharing their rights of way by the year 2023. This proposal so far has not been implemented thus making it necessary to transfer trains at Gimpo International Airport.

Ticket price debate 
Negotiations in 2005 between the operator and the Seoul city government resulted in an agreement of a basic fare rate set at 1,264 won upon opening of the line in 2009 with a further increase to 1,398 won by 2012 to allow for inflation. Prior to opening of the line, the operator requested a base rate of 1,300 won. The city government decided against this by citing a domestic financial crisis and potential complaints from riders if the price was set at a higher rate than the rest of the subway system. The city therefore set the initial ticket fare at 900 won, the standard fare for entrance to the rest of the Seoul subway system in 2009. The rate was locked for a period of 12 months and was later locked for three years despite multiple requests from the operator for a higher starting fare.

In February 2012, the price increased to 1,050 won across all metro lines, including Line 9. Within two months, Metro9, the operator of Line 9, announced the price would further increase another 500 won starting from June 16, 2012 on only Line 9. The Seoul city government disagreed with this and threatened to fine Metro9 10 million won per day if the 500 won price increase occurred. The planned rate increase was withdrawn on May 9, and Metro9 issued an apology. Seoul City will be in negotiations again with the help of legal counsel to determine the differences of opinions in the original agreement. Currently, an additional scan of a metro card transfers in between Line 9 and other Seoul subway lines does not accrue additional fees.

Construction costs and deficit 
The construction of Phase 1 cost 900 billion won (roughly equivalent to 827 million US dollars), 480 billion of which was pooled between 12 firms with the remaining borne by Seoul city and the national government. By 2012, the line was operating at a loss with 90% of losses being covered by the city. The accumulated deficit has passed 180 billion won.

While Phase 2 was always planned to go ahead as scheduled, a Seoul Metropolitan Government website at one point described construction of Phase 3 as being suspended in consideration of transport demand and financial considerations. On November 20, 2008, the Seoul Metropolitan government announced plans to build Phase 3 between October 2010 and December 2015.

Stations 
Express trains stop at stations marked "●" and pass stations marked "|". There is no express service at stations filled in black on the "EX" column.

See also 
 Rapid transit in South Korea

References

External links 
 Seoul Metro Line 9 Corporation Homepage
 The Seoul Underground Subway : Official Tourism (English)
 Seoul Metropolitan Government Line 9 page (Korean) includes a route map, status information and links to the construction companies' websites
 UrbanRail.Net's Seoul Subway page
 New Subway Line Connects Gimpo Airport to Southern Seoul
 SMRT Map, station and route finder

 
Seoul Metropolitan Subway lines
Airport rail links in South Korea
RATP Group
Transdev